Rocky Hill is an unincorporated community in Edmonson County, Kentucky, United States, located south of Mammoth Cave National Park. It is part of the Bowling Green, Kentucky Metropolitan Statistical Area.

History

Rocky Hill used to be a coal dropoff for the Louisville and Nashville Railroad before the 1930s. During the 1920s, the town had a population in the thousands and was booming with business. It had two livery stables, a general store, a railroad station, and two hotels. Devastation hit the town when it burned, burning down half of the city because of the inability of the volunteer fire department. Since then the VFD has strengthened greatly. After the fire, most people moved away from the city and the railroad stopped dropping off coal.

Since then the town has tried to keep their heritage alive every year by hosting Rocky Hill Days at the VFD. A Civil War re-enactment has recently been added to the festival, with the hopes of having the re-enactment become an annual event.

Nearby cities
 Bowling Green
 Brownsville
 Glasgow

References

Unincorporated communities in Edmonson County, Kentucky
Unincorporated communities in Kentucky
Bowling Green metropolitan area, Kentucky